The 2022 United States House of Representatives elections in Hawaii were held on November 8, 2022, to elect the two U.S. representatives from the state of Hawaii, one from each of the state's two congressional districts. The elections coincided with other elections to the House of Representatives, elections to the United States Senate and various state and local elections.

Overview

District
Results of the 2022 United States House of Representatives elections in Hawaii by district:

District 1

The 1st district is located entirely on the island of Oahu, centering on Honolulu and the towns of Aiea, Mililani, Pearl City, Waipahu and Waimalu. The incumbent is Democrat Ed Case, who was re-elected with 72.0% of the vote in 2020.

Democratic primary

Candidates

Nominee
Ed Case, incumbent U.S. Representative and Co-Chair of the Blue Dog Coalition

Eliminated in primary
Sergio Alcubilla, attorney and former director of external relations at the Legal Aid Society of Hawaii

Endorsements

Polling

Results

Republican primary

Candidates

Nominee
Conrad Kress, former United States Navy SEAL

Eliminated in primary
Patrick Largey, activist
Arturo Reyes, perennial candidate

Results

Nonpartisan primary

Candidates

Eliminated in primary
Steven Abkin, construction manager and engineer (also running as Democrat)
Calvin Griffin, perennial candidate

Failed to qualify 
Joseph Gilmore (write-in)

Results

General election

Predictions

Results

District 2

The 2nd district takes in rural and suburban Oahu, including Waimanalo Beach, Kailua, Kaneohe, Kahuku, Makaha, Nanakuli, as well as encompassing all the other islands of Hawaii, taking in Maui and Hilo. The incumbent is Democrat Kai Kahele, who was elected with 63.0% of the vote in 2020. He has announced that he will be running for Hawaii governor.

Democratic primary

Candidates

Nominee
Jill Tokuda, former state senator and candidate for Lieutenant Governor of Hawaii in 2018 (previously filed to run for Lieutenant Governor)

Eliminated in primary
Patrick Branco, state representative
Nicole Gi, environmental engineer
Brendan Schultz, humanitarian aid nonprofit founder
Steven Sparks
Kyle Yoshida, mechanical engineer

Declined
Jarrett Keohokalole, state senator (running for re-election)
Kai Kahele, incumbent U.S. Representative (running for governor)

Endorsements

Polling

Results

Republican primary

Candidates

Nominee
Joe Akana, business development professional and nominee for this district in 2020

Eliminated in primary
Joe Webster

Results

Libertarian Party

Nominee
Michelle Tippens, U.S. Army veteran and perennial candidate

Results

Independents

Declared 

 John "Raghu" Giuffre

Declined
 Charles Djou, former Republican U.S. representative for Hawaii's 1st congressional district (2010–2011) and candidate for Mayor of Honolulu in 2016

General election

Predictions

Results

Notes

Partisan clients

References

External links
Official campaign websites for 1st district candidates
Ed Case (D) for Congress
Conrad Kress (R) for Congress

Official campaign websites for 2nd district candidates
Joe Akana (R) for Congress
Jill Tokuda (D) for Congress

2022
Hawaii
United States House of Representatives